The men's lightweight coxless pair competition at the 2017 World Rowing Championships in Sarasota took place in Nathan Benderson Park.

Schedule
The schedule was as follows:

All times are Eastern Daylight Time (UTC-4)

Results

Heats
Heat winners advanced directly to the A final. The remaining boats were sent to the repechage.

Heat 1

Heat 2

Repechage
The four fastest boats advanced to the A final. The remaining boats were sent to the B final.

Finals
The A final determined the rankings for places 1 to 6. Additional rankings were determined in the B final.

Final B

Final A

References

2017 World Rowing Championships